Fort San Felipe may refer to:

 Fortaleza San Felipe in Puerto Plata, Dominican Republic on Hispaniola - the oldest fortress in the New World.
 Fort San Felipe del Morro, San Juan, Puerto Rico
 Fort San Felipe (Cavite), Philippines
 Fort San Felipe, Santa Elena (Spanish Florida), burned down 1576 
 Fort St. Philip,  Plaquemines Parish, Louisiana